The following is a list of notable events that are related to French music in 2016.

Albums released

January
 22 January : H Magnum - Gotham City
 26 January : Dionysos - Vampire en pyjama
 29 January : Lefa - Monsieur Fall

February
 5 February : Joyce Jonathan - Une place pour moi
 5 February : Kohndo - Intra-Muros
 5 February : Pascal Obispo - Billet de femme
 5 February : Salvatore Adamo - L'amour n'a jamais tort
 26 February :  - ERROR 404
 26 February : Emji - Folies douces
 26 February : Jazzy Bazz - P-Town
 26 February : Kool Shen - Sur le fil du rasoir
 26 February :  - Darksun 2

March
 4 March : 13 Block - Violence Urbaine Émeute
 4 March : La Fouine - Nouveau Monde
 4 March : Lartiste - Maestro
 11 March : Fababy - Ange & Démon
 25 March : The Shin Sekaï - Indéfini

April
 1 April : Mickey 3D - Sebolavy
 8 April : Christophe - Les Vestiges du chaos
 8 April :  - Have You Met Gaspard Royant?
 8 April : M83 - Junk
 8 April : Renaud - Renaud / Toujours debout
 8 April : Sultan - Condamné à Régner
 15 April : Jean-Louis Murat - Morituri
 15 April : MHD - MHD
 22 April : Benjamin Biolay - Hollywood Palermo
 22 April :  - Godspeed
 22 April : MZ - La Dictature
 29 April : Hooss - French Riviera, Vol.2
 29 April : Tiers Monde - No Future

May
 6 May : Djadja & Dinaz - On s'promet
 13 May : Christophe Maé - L'attrape-rêves
 20 May : Alonzo - Avenue de Saint-Antoine
 20 May : FK - Purple Kemet
 20 May : GLK - Murder
 20 May : PSO Thug - Demoniak
 27 May : Keny Arkana - État d'urgence
 27 May : Miossec - Mammifères
 27 May : Niro : Or Game
 27 May : SCH

June
 3 June : Guizmo - #GPG
 3 June : Niska - Zifukoro
 3 June : Superbus - Sixtape
 10 June : Air - Twentyears
 17 June : Gojira - Magma
 17 June :  - Destins liés
 24 June :  - Sadisme et Perversion
 24 June : Jul - Émotions
 24 June : Souf - Alchimie

July

August

September
 Kery James : TBD

October
 28 October: Black M - Éternel insatisfait

November
 18 November: Justice - Woman

December

 
French music
French